The 1971 U.S. Professional Indoor – Men's singles was an event of the 1971 U.S. Professional Indoor tennis tournament played at the Spectrum in Philadelphia, Pennsylvania in the United States from February 9 through February 14, 1971. The draw comprised 32 players and 12 of them were seeded. First-seeded Rod Laver was the defending singles champion. Third-seeded John Newcombe won the title, defeating Laver 7–6(7–5), 7–6(7–1), 6–4 in the final.

Seeds

Draw

Finals

Top half

Bottom half

References

External links
 Main draw

U.S. Pro Indoor
1971 Grand Prix (tennis)